Mahmut Şevket Karman (16 May 1912 – 3 October 1989) was a Turkish alpine skier. He competed in the men's combined event at the 1936 Winter Olympics.

Participated in the Olympic Games in Garmisch-Partenkirchen (1936) in two disciplines. In alpine skiing, he competed in the combined event – the only alpine competition. After the downhill he was ranked 59th, out of the classified alpine skiers he was only ahead of his compatriot Reşat Erceş. In the slalom, he was disqualified, leaving him unclassified.

References

1912 births
1989 deaths
Turkish male alpine skiers
Turkish male cross-country skiers
Olympic alpine skiers of Turkey
Olympic cross-country skiers of Turkey
Alpine skiers at the 1936 Winter Olympics
Cross-country skiers at the 1936 Winter Olympics
Sportspeople from Trabzon
20th-century Turkish people